Wax tree is a common name for several plants and may refer to:

Catalpa
Ligustrum lucidum, native to southern China
Toxicodendron succedaneum